Kristian Frost Olesen (born February 9, 1989 in London), known as Kristian Frost, is a professional squash player who represented Denmark. He reached a career-high world ranking of World No. 52 in April 2013.

References

External links 
 
 

1989 births
Living people
Danish male squash players